The 2021 WNBA Commissioner's Cup was the WNBA's first ever Commissioner's Cup in league history. The Cup Final featured the top Eastern Conference Cup Connecticut Sun facing off against the top Western Conference team Seattle Storm.  The Sun came into the Cup Final with a Cup record of 9–1 against fellow Eastern Conference teams, while the Storm entered with a 8–2 record against their Western Conference counterparts.

Led by Cup MVP Breanna Stewart, Seattle won the game by double-digits, claiming the inaugural Cup Final Title.

Road to the Cup Final
The Commissioner's Cup starts by designating a portion of regular-season games – 10 games per team – as counting towards Cup play. The team from each conference with the top record in designated “Cup games” then compete for the Commissioner's Cup title and a special prize pool. Cup games are the first home game and first road game each team plays against its five conference rivals.

Standings
Source:

Game Summary
Coming out of the Olympics Break, Seattle showed no signs of fatigue with having 5 players playing in the Olympics. They worked well together and jumped out to an early lead. The Sun battled back together down 10 after the first quarter. The game was back and forth in the second quarter and the Sun trailed by just five with 4:50 to play in the second and would have cut their deficit to eight at the break had DeWanna Bonner's half court make just after the buzzer counted. It wasn't until the Storm won the third 22-5 that the game was truly out of reach.

Seattle scored the first eight points out of the break with four coming from Sue Bird, who ended the second with a trey. The Storm went on to lead by as many as 31 and Bird finished with 10 points and five assists. The third member of Seattle's big three, Jewell Loyd, notched 16 points and three assists.

Team rosters

References

External links
WNBA.com

Recurring sporting events established in 2020
Women's National Basketball Association Commissioner's Cup